The 1992 San Diego State Aztecs football team represented San Diego State University during the 1992 NCAA Division I-A football season as a member of the Western Athletic Conference (WAC).

The team was led by head coach Al Luginbill, in his fourth year. They played home games at Jack Murphy Stadium in San Diego. They completed the season with a record of five wins, five losses and one tie (5–5–1, 5–3 WAC).

Schedule

Roster

Team players in the NFL
No SDSU players were selected in the 1993 NFL Draft.

The following finished their college career in 1992, were not drafted, but played in the NFL.

Team awards

Notes

References

San Diego State
San Diego State Aztecs football seasons
San Diego State Aztecs football